Shahpur is a city and a town in Palamu District, Jharkhand, India. It is near to Medininagr (Daltonganj). It is a twin city of Medininagar. This is one of the historical cities in Jharkhand, India. This city is connected by Medininagr through the Shahpur Bridge and is bordered and separated by Koyal River. Shahpur has many historical places, landmarks and monuments.

Etymology 
Shahpur is a city. Shah is a Persian title given to peoples, kings and lords of Iran. This name is widely used in the names of cities in many countries including India, Pakistan, Nepal, Bangladesh, Burma, and Afghanistan among others.

Pur is a placename element found in the names of cities in the Indian subcontinent, especially those in India, Bangladesh and the eastern regions of Pakistan. Examples include the cities of Jaipur and Nagpur.

Historical Significance 
Shahpur was built during the time of Daltonganj. It has various historical landmarks. One of the most famous is Shahpur Fort. It is one of the oldest forts in the country, It was built during the time of the kings, lords and the British. There is also a shrine located here.

Education

Schools 

 Mission Public School
 Patel Raman High School
 Red Rose Public School
 Sahodaya High School
 Sanskar Academy
 RMPSI Public School
 Rotary School Chainpur

Economy 
The economy of Shahpur is dependent on tourism, trade and commerce. There are transport connections between Shahpur and Daltonganj. The needs of Shahpur are being fulfilled by Daltonganj and the government. Shahpur has various stores and banks.

Authorised traders in Shahpur include Jaiswal Traders, Shree Durga Traders etc. These trade various cements, buildings materials etc. A water supply pump is located in Shahpur at North Koel River.

Tourist attractions 

 Shahpur Fort
 Hazrat Karim Shah Wali Data Mazar
 Shiv Mandir
 Jama Masjid Shahpur
 Koyal River
 Shahpur Bridge

See also 

 Medininagar (Daltonganj)

References 

Jharkhand